Adrián Menéndez Maceiras was the defending champion but lost in the third round to Lucas Miedler.

Sebastian Ofner won the title after defeating John-Patrick Smith 7–6(10–8), 3–6, 6–3 in the final.

Seeds
All seeds receive a bye into the second round.

Draw

Finals

Top half

Section 1

Section 2

Bottom half

Section 3

Section 4

References

External links
Main draw
Qualifying draw

Puerto Vallarta Open - Singles